Agnippe deserta is a moth of the family Gelechiidae. It is found in Uzbekistan and Turkmenistan.

The wingspan is 9–10 mm. The forewings have a narrow, light brown basal patch, with two overlapping brown spots. The hindwings are light grey. Adults are on wing from early May to mid June.

Etymology
The name of the species refers to the species being recorded from desert areas and is derived from Latin deserta (meaning desert).

References

Moths described in 2010
Agnippe
Moths of Asia